The 1904 Dickinson football team was an American football team that represented Dickinson College as an independent during the 1904 college football season. The team compiled an 8–3–1 record and outscored opponents by a total of 219 to 53. Professor Forrest Craver was chosen as the team's head football coach; he had been the captain of Dickinson's 1897 team.

Schedule

References

Dickinson
Dickinson Red Devils football seasons
Dickinson football